Broad River Correctional Institution (BRCI) is a South Carolina Department of Corrections state prison for men located in Columbia, South Carolina. The State of South Carolina execution chamber is located in Broad River. The adjacent Kirkland Correctional Institution lies just to its south side.

The prison opened in 1988. In January 1990, the death row inmates were moved from the Central Correctional Institution to Broad River. In 1990, executions began at BRCI. On April 12, 1997, death row inmates were moved to the Lieber Correctional Institution. In September 2017, death row inmates were moved to Kirkland Correctional Institution. On July 11, 2019, death row inmates were moved from Kirkland Correctional Institution to the housing unit that was originally built for them at Broad River.

Notable inmates

Death Row
Quincy Allen – Serial killer who murdered four people.
Steven Bixby – Perpetrator of the 2003 standoff in Abbeville, South Carolina.
Richard Bernard Moore – Convicted of murdering a convenience store clerk during a robbery.
Stephen Stanko – Convicted murderer who killed two people.
James William Wilson, Jr. – Perpetrator of the Oakland Elementary School shooting.

Executed
John Arnold – Executed March 6, 1998, for the racially-motivated murder of Betty Gardner.
Joseph Ernest Atkins – Executed January 23, 1999, for the murders of Karen Patterson and Benjamin F. Atkins.
Larry Gene Bell – Executed October 4, 1996, for the murders of Sharon Faye Smith and Debra Helmick.
Joseph Gardner – Executed December 5, 2008, for the murder of Melissa McLauchlin.
Donald Henry Gaskins – Executed September 6, 1991, for the murder of Rudolph Tyner, a fellow inmate on death row.
Shawn Paul Humphries – Executed December 2, 2005, for the murder of Dickie Smith.
Richard Longworth – Executed April 15, 2005, for the murders of Alex Hopps and James Green.
John Plath – Executed July 10, 1998, for the racially-motivated murder of Betty Gardner.
James Earl Reed – Executed June 20, 2008, for the murders of Barbara and Joseph Lafayette.
David Rocheville – Executed December 3, 1999, for the murders of Alex Hopps and James Green.
Michael Torrence – Executed September 6, 1996, for the murders of Dennis Lollis, Charles Bush, and Cynthia Williams.
James Neil Tucker – Executed May 28, 2004, for the murders of Rosa Lee Dolly Oakley and Shannon Mellon.
Hastings Arthur Wise – Executed November 4, 2005, for the murders of Charles Griffeth, David Moore, Leonard Filyaw, and Sheryl Wood.

Non-Death Row
Todd Kohlhepp – Serial killer, mass murderer, and rapist who pled guilty to 7 murders, 2 kidnappings, and 1 sexual assault in 2017.

References

External links 
 South Carolina Department of Corrections

Buildings and structures in Columbia, South Carolina
Capital punishment in the United States
Execution sites in the United States
State prisons in South Carolina
1988 establishments in South Carolina